{{Speciesbox
| image = 
| image2 = 
| taxon = Charaxes loandae
| authority = van Someren, 1969 <ref>Van Someren, V.G.L. 1969. Revisional notes on African Charaxes (Lepidoptera: Nymphalidae). Part V. Bulletin of the British Museum (Natural History) (Entomology) 23: 75-166.</ref>

| synonyms =Charaxes viola loandae van Someren, 1969Charaxes viola loandae f. primitiva van Someren, 1969Charaxes viola loandae f. basiviridis van Someren, 1969Charaxes viola loandae f. violitincta van Someren, 1969Charaxes viola loandae f. vansonoides van Someren, 1969Charaxes viola loandae f. protokirki van Someren, 1969Charaxes viola loandae f. instabilis van Someren, 1969
}}Charaxes loandae is a butterfly in the family Nymphalidae. It is found in Angola. The habitat consists of Brachystegia woodland (Miombo).

TaxonomyCharaxes loandae is a member of the large species group Charaxes etheocles.
Considered to be a junior synonym of Charaxes diversiforma by Turlin (2011)

References

van Someren, V.G.L., 1969 Revisional notes on African Charaxes (Lepidoptera: Nymphalidae). Part V. Bulletin of the British Museum'' (Natural History) (Entomology)75-166.

External links
Charaxes loandae images at Consortium for the Barcode of Life

Butterflies described in 1969
loandae
Endemic fauna of Angola
Butterflies of Africa